The Thoothukkudi City Municipal Corporation ( TCMC; ,) is the governing civic body of Thoothukudi, the sea gate of the southern Indian state of Tamil Nadu. It was established by the Government of Tamil Nadu under the Thoothukkudi City Municipal Corporation Act, 2008 (Tamil Nadu Act 27 of 2008). The corporation is responsible for the civic infrastructure and administration of the city and some suburbs.

The corporation consists of a legislative and an executive body. The legislative body is headed by the Mayor and assisted by a Deputy Mayor, while the executive body is headed by a Commissioner of the corporation. It consists of 60 wards within the city's limit.

The headquarters of the corporation is located near Perunthalaivar Kamarajar Market at Tamizh Salai, Thoothukkudi.

History 
Thoothukkudi City Municipal Corporation is one of the 21 municipal corporations in the state of Tamil Nadu. Thoothukkudi was constituted as a municipality as per the Town Improvement Act of 1865 on 1st November 1866. It upgraded the status of municipal corporation on 5 August 2008 after 142 years of being a municipality in view of rapid increase in population and extension of administrative boundaries.

The jurisdiction of Thoothukkudi City Municipal Corporation has been extended in May 2011, to include the areas of the city Corporation, 3 Municipalities, 17 Town Panchayats and 11 Village Panchayats located around the corporation. Consequent to this extension, the total area of the corporation has increased considerably from 13.47 Sq.km. to 90.66 Sq.km. and the numbers of the wards have increased from 51 to 60. The extended Municipal Corporation had a population of 3,72,408 as per 2011 census.

Linkages and Connectivity
It is served by three main roads which radiate to Tiruchendur, Tirunelveli and Madurai. The town is also well connected by two National Highways: NH-138 to Tirunelveli, which it turn connects to NH-44 (Kanniyakumari to Srinagar) and NH-38 to Madurai, the temple-city of Tamil Nadu. The town is also linked with Gulf of Mannar bay.

The town is well connected by rail to other parts of the country with linkage to the V.O. Chidambaranar Port Trust.

Topography
The town is located at the longitude 78°13′E and latitude 8°45′N. The topography of the town is almost flat Terrain sloping from west to east direction towards the sea.

Climate
The maximum temperature during summer is 39°C and during winter it is 32°C. Monsoon in Thoothukkudi is normally characterized by heavy rains and thunderstorms.

Structure
Zones of Thoothukkudi City Municipal Corporation are
 Thoothukkudi North
 Thoothukkudi East
 Thoothukkudi West
 Thoothukkudi South

Departments

List of mayors

List of deputy mayors

List of commissioners

References

External links 
 
 http://www.thoothukudicorporation.com/contactus.html
 http://www.thoothukudicorporation.com/rate-and-reviews.html
 http://www.thoothukudicorporation.com/about_corporation_act.html

Thoothukudi Corporation Thooimai Thinam 
 http://www.thoothukudicorporation.com/thoothukudi-corporation-thooimai-thinam.html
 http://www.thoothukudicorporation.com/thooimai-thoothukudi.html

Municipal corporations in Tamil Nadu
Thoothukudi
1866 establishments in British India
2008 establishments in Tamil Nadu